Plasmodium relictum is a species in the genus Plasmodium, subgenus Haemamoeba. 

It is a parasite, and the most common cause of malaria in birds.

Like all Plasmodium species, P. relictum has both vertebrate and insect hosts. The vertebrate hosts for this parasite are birds.

Distribution 
P. relictum is geographically widespread, and is the most widespread malaria parasite of birds. Climate change is broadening its distribution further and is expected to continue to do so, including into higher elevations.

Hosts

Avian 
P. relictum infects a wide variety of birds including birds from various orders. Infections in numerous wild birds and experimental animals have been described including partridges, canaries, chickens, ducks, pigeons and Spheniscus magellanicus (Magellanic penguins). Experimental attempts to infect owls were not successful, suggesting owls may not be susceptible to P. relictum.

Vector 
Culex quinquefasciatus, Cu. stigmatosoma and Cu. tarsalis.

References

Further reading 
  .

External links
 
 

relictum
Poultry diseases